Sonbolabad may refer to:

Sonbolabad, Qazvin
Sonbolabad, Zanjan
Sonbolabad Rural District, in Zanjan Province